ATLAS Arts is a visual arts organisation dedicated to commissioning contemporary arts, culture, heritage, and education based in the Isle of Skye. It was formed in 2010 and since then has delivered a varied programme of contemporary art including installations, sculpture, live performances, film screenings, and collaborative public works. It is one of Creative Scotland's portfolio of regularly-funded organisations.

History 
ATLAS Arts was founded in 2010, partly in response to the closure of Skye's former arts centre An Tuireann, and following research conducted by the Scottish Arts Council which found that Skye and Lochalsh had the largest gap in visual arts provision in the northwest of Scotland. Initially the organisation was hosted by HI~Arts (a cultural development agency for the Highlands and Islands of Scotland) until 2012, when it became an independent organisation with charitable status.

From 2013 to 2015 ATLAS Arts collaborated with the Uist-based museum and arts centre Taigh Chearsabhagh to produce a pan-island programme of exhibitions, events, performances, and new commissions. Called Broad Reach, this included hosting an exhibition of work by Vija Celmins as part of the ARTIST ROOMS series of touring exhibitions.

In summer 2014 ATLAS Arts participated in the Scotland-wide exhibition programme GENERATION: 25, commissioning a two large scale out door works and public programme by artists Joanne Tatham and Tom O’Sullivan.

In October 2014 it was announced that the organisation had secured three-year funding as part of Creative Scotland's portfolio of 119 regularly-funded organisations for the period 2015–2018.

Aims 
ATLAS Arts' stated aims are to promote the advancement of contemporary art, and culture by promoting and enabling access, initiating projects, and providing opportunities for artists. A strong theme reflected in all the work commissioned by the organisation has been the environment, history, and culture of Isle of Skye and beyond. 
Additionally the organisation also promotes the advancement of education and the general public's awareness of visual art and culture through a variety of learning programmes including exhibitions, film screenings, performances, talks, workshops, and publications.

Past projects 
Artists whom ATLAS Arts have exhibited or collaborated with include:
Alec Finlay
Alex Frost
Anne Martin
Augustus Veinoglou
Bethan Huws
Bobby Niven
Cailean Maclean
Caroline Bergvall
Caroline Dear
Ceara Conway
Colin McPherson
Cooking Sections (Daniel Fernández Pascual & Alon Schwabe)
Chris Dooks
Craig Coulthard
David Lemm
David Littler
Deirdre Nelson
Derek Robertson
Edwin Pickstone
Ellie Harrison
Emma Balkind
Frances Priest
Graham Fagan
Hanna Tuulikki
Hardeep Pandhal
Hector MacInnes
Henry Castle
Ilana Halperin
In the Shadow of the Hand (Sarah Forrest and Virginia Hutchinson)
J. Maizlish Mole
Jason Singh
Jeremy Sutton-Hibbert
Jessica Ramm
Joanne Tatham
John Akomfrah
Johnny Rodger
Kate McMorrine
Keg de Souza
Kirsty McKeown
Lateral North
Leighton Jones
Let's Talk about Space (Kieran Heather and Chris McGarry)
Luke Fowler
Marcus Jack
Margaret Salmon
Martin Campbell
Maoilios Caimbeul, also known as Myles Campbell
Meg Bateman
Michail Mersinis
Morag Henriksen
Niall Macdonald
Neil Bromwich
Neil Mulholland
Nick Hand
Nicky Bird
René Jansen
Richard Skelton
Robin Haig
Rody Gorman
Ruth Barker
Sharon Quigley
Sophie Gerrard
Sophie Morrish
Su Grierson
Susan Brind
Steve Dilworth
Stuart McAdam
Thomas Joshua Cooper
Thomson & Craighead (Jon Thomson and Alison Craighead)
Tom O’Sullivan
Vija Celmins
Will Maclean
Wounded Knee, also known as Drew Wright
Zoë Walker

See also
 Creative Scotland
 GENERATION: 25 Years of Contemporary Art in Scotland
 Artist Rooms

External links

References 

Art museums and galleries in Scotland
Arts organisations based in Scotland
Highlands and Islands of Scotland
Scottish contemporary art
Portree
2010 establishments in Scotland